Civil Union Act may refer to:
 Civil Union Act 2004 (New Zealand)
 Civil Union Act, 2006 (South Africa)

See also
 Civil union